Hypatopa texo is a moth in the family Blastobasidae. It is found in Costa Rica.

The length of the forewings is 4.5–5.7 mm. The forewings are dark brown intermixed with brown and pale-brown scales. The hindwings are translucent pale brown.

Etymology
The specific name is derived from Latin textilis (meaning a woven textile).

References

Moths described in 2013
Hypatopa